Roger Kindt (18 September 1945 – 3 April 1992) was a Belgian racing cyclist. He rode in the 1972 Tour de France.

References

1945 births
1992 deaths
Belgian male cyclists
Place of birth missing
20th-century Belgian people